The épée event for amateurs was one of three épée events at the 1900 Summer Olympics. 102 fencers from 11 nations competed, with 91 of them from France. The event was won by Ramón Fonst of Cuba, the first of his two golds in individual épée. Silver and bronze both went to host nation fencers, Louis Perrée and Léon Sée.
  These poorly organized games  derisively called “The Farcical Games”  and so poorly publicized that even competitors years later were clueless that they had competed in the Olympics in 1900. No official records for the games exist.  These accomplishments are not even mentioned in the 1911 Encyclopædia Britannica.

This was the first appearance of the event, which was not held at the first Games in 1896 (with only foil and sabre events held) but has been held at every Summer Olympics since 1900.

Competition format

The event used a four-round format: round 1, quarterfinals, semifinals, and a final. Each round consisted of pool play. For round 1, the fencers were divided into 17 pools of 6 or 7 fencers each; the top two fencers in each pool advanced to the quarterfinals. The quarterfinals were intended to divide the 34 fencers into 6 pools of 5 or 6 fencers each; after 3 men withdrew, the round consisted of 5 pools of 6 fencers plus a special pool of the last remaining fencer plus 4 of the losers from the first 5 pools. The top 3 fencers in each pool advanced to the semifinals. The semifinals had the 18 men compete in 3 pools of 6, with the top 3 in each pool advancing to a 9-man final.

The actual competition format within pools is not entirely clear. Only results from the final are known. In the final, each fencer had 5 or 6 bouts (rather than 8, which would be the number if a full round-robin were held). The top places were determined by number of wins, with a barrage held when two fencers finished with 4 wins (though one had only 1 loss while the other had 2).

Schedule

Results

Round 1

The first round of the event consisted of pool play round-robin tournaments. Each fencer faced each other fencer once. Of the 17 pools, 15 had six fencers each and 2 had seven. The top two placers in each advanced to the quarterfinals.

Pool A

Pool B

Pool C

Pool D

Pool E

Pool F

Pool G

Pool H

Pool I

Pool J

Pool K

Pool L

Pool M

Pool N

Pool O

Pool P

Pool Q

Quarterfinals

The quarterfinals were again round-robin affairs. The original schedule was that there would be six pools: two would have five fencers each and four would have six fencers, with the top three in each pool to advance.

After three of the original quarterfinalists (Maurice Jay, André Rabel, and Jean-Joseph Renaud) withdrew after the draw,  the quarterfinals were redrawn: there were five pools with six fencers each, while the sixth pool included Holzchuch and four fencers who had lost in other quarterfinals and were given a second chance to advance.

Quarterfinal A

Quarterfinal B

Quarterfinal C

Quarterfinal D

Quarterfinal E

Quarterfinal F

Semifinals

The semifinals, with 18 fencers left, were conducted in three pools of round-robin play. Each pool had six fencers, with the top three advancing to the final.

Semifinal A

Semifinal B

Semifinal C

Final

In the final, each fencer had either 5 or 6 bouts. Fonst and Perrée initially tied for first with 4 wins each, then Fonst won the barrage to break the tie.

Results summary

Notes

Fencing at the 1900 Summer Olympics